Running while Black is a sardonic description of racial profiling experienced by Black runners in the United States and Canada.
In the United States, jogging gained popularity after World War II, and has largely been portrayed by American media as an activity typically engaged in by White people; joggers of color are treated with suspicion. Black runners report taking precautions such as wearing bright colors to appear non-threatening, avoiding running outside of daylight hours, running in groups for safety, and avoiding running fast enough to appear to be "running away from something."

In 2021, Lyndsey Hornbuckle found that the issue was particularly common when Black people were running in White neighborhoods, and especially higher socioeconomic White neighborhoods.

Sonia Sanchez's 1968 play The Bronx is Next includes a scene in which a White police officer arrests a Black person for running while Black.
The 2001 US Supreme Court case Illinois v. Wardlow, which upheld the legality of a police search of a person based on the person running from police, has been described by civil libertarians as creating a new criminal offense of "running while black."
Examples of racial incidents due to "running while Black" also include the 2015 death of Freddie Gray in Baltimore,
the 2015 arrest of Jimmy Thoronka in London, a 2019 incident in Vancouver, Canada, and the 2020 murder of Ahmaud Arbery in Georgia, U.S.

See also 

 Driving while black
 Shopping while black
 The talk (racism in the US)
 Traveling While Black

References

Further reading 

 Dragan Milovanovic, Katheryn Russell-Brown (2001). Petit Apartheid in the U.S. Criminal Justice System. Carolina Academic Press. .
 

American phraseology
Anti-black racism in the United States
Ethically disputed judicial practices
English phrases
Offender profiling
African-American-related controversies
Race-related controversies in the United States
Law enforcement controversies in the United States
Race and crime in the United States
Race and law
Snowclones
Stereotypes of African Americans
Word play